Lezama is a railway station in Lezama, Basque Country, Spain. It is owned by Euskal Trenbide Sarea and operated by Euskotren. It lies on the Txorierri line.

History 
The original terminus of the line was the nearby Kurtzea station (originally known as Lezama station), which was opened together with the Txorierri line in 1894. In 1994, the railway was extended and a new station was built closer to the population center of the town.

In October 2009, a 300 series train crashed into a buffer stop at the station, killing the driver and injuring several passengers.

The station was renovated in 2018 after trains on the Txorierri line started running through metro line 3.

Services 
The station is served by Euskotren Trena line E3. It runs every 15 minutes (in each direction) during weekdays, and every 30 minutes during weekends.

References

External links
 

Euskotren Trena stations
Railway stations in Biscay
Railway stations in Spain opened in 1994
1994 establishments in the Basque Country (autonomous community)